Super 8 is the association of boys' schools in the central North Island of New Zealand. The association is mainly a sporting one, which was established in 1997 in response to the lack of competition that the schools faced in their home regions. The schools are some of the top sporting schools in New Zealand. Super 8 is the first high school competition in New Zealand to sign with a television company. Every week a Super 8 rugby match will be chosen and streamed on Maori Television, along with various other sporting finals.

Schools
Gisborne Boys' High School
Hamilton Boys' High School
Hastings Boys' High School
Napier Boys' High School
New Plymouth Boys' High School
Palmerston North Boys' High School
Rotorua Boys' High School
Tauranga Boys' College

Major Competition winners
Rugby

Cricket

Football

External links
http://www.super8.co.nz/

Associations of schools
Lists of schools in New Zealand
Sport in New Zealand